FC Rubin-2 Kazan was a Russian association football club from Kazan, founded in 1997. It last played in the Russian Second Division, where it has been playing since 2004. It was a farm club of FC Rubin Kazan. It was dissolved after the 2014–15 season.

References

External links
Official website

Association football clubs established in 2004
Association football clubs disestablished in 2015
Football clubs in Russia
Sport in Kazan
FC Rubin Kazan
2004 establishments in Russia
2015 establishments in Russia